Alada Empresa de Transportes Aéreos was an airline based in Luanda, Angola. Established in 1995, it operated chartered passenger and cargo flights out of Quatro de Fevereiro Airport, Luanda. Their AOC was revoked in 2010.

Fleet 
As of June 2011, the Alada fleet included the following aircraft:
1 Antonov An-12
2 Antonov An-32
2 Ilyushin Il-18

References

External links
  via Wayback Machine

Companies based in Luanda
Defunct airlines of Angola
Airlines established in 1995
Airlines disestablished in 2010